John A. Ricketts (February 29, 1924 – June 29, 2007) was an American chemist, chemistry educator and academic. He was a former Simeon Smith Professor of Chemistry at DePauw University.
He was lecturer in chemistry at Fenn College (which later became Cleveland State University) in Cleveland, Ohio. before joining DePauw.
He was director of graduate studies at DePauw from 1966 until 1970.

Selected publications

References

External links

20th-century American chemists
DePauw University faculty
Case Western Reserve University alumni
Indiana University alumni
1924 births
2007 deaths
Cleveland State University faculty